Nuk Band (also Romanized as Nūk Band) is a village in Irafshan Rural District, Ashar District, Mehrestan County, Sistan and Baluchestan Province, Iran. At the 2006 census, its population was 44, in 9 families.

References 

Populated places in Mehrestan County